Afghanistan participated in the 1982 Asian Games in Delhi, India on November 19 to December 4, 1982. Afghanistan ended the games with one silver medal.

References

Nations at the 1982 Asian Games
1982
Asian Games